Tokarara is residential suburb located on the North West of Port Moresby, the capital city of Papua New Guinea.

Suburbs of Port Moresby